This is a list of folk musicians.

Albania

Eli Fara
Fatime Sokoli
Nikollë Nikprelaj

Andean

Savia Andina

Argentina

Huldreslåt
Mercedes Sosa
Eduardo Falu
Jorge Cafrune
Ariel Ramirez
Los Fronterizos

Armenia

Djivan Gasparyan
Udi Hrant
Gor Mkhitarian

Australia

Paul Kelly
Blue King Brown
Eric Bogle
Kasey Chambers
Roaring Jack
Judy Small
The Waifs
Sarah Blasko
The Seekers
Boy And Bear
Angus & Julia Stone
Siobhan Owen
Matthew John Corby

Indigenous Australians

Kerrianne Cox
David Hudson
Archie Roach

Azerbaijan

Mugham

Ashik

 Ali Ekber Çiçek
 Aşık Mahzuni Şerif
 Aşık Khanlar
 Aşık Veysel
 Neşet Ertaş
 Aşiq Ələsgər
 Jivani
 Sayat-Nova
 Karacaoğlan
 Kul Nesîmî
 Pir Sultan Abdal

Bangladesh

Lalon
Hason Raja
Abbasuddin Ahmed
Shah Abdul Karim
Momtaz Begum
Habib Wahid
Farida Parveen
Salma Akhter
Bari Siddiqui
Ferdausi Rahman
Abdur Rahman Boyati

Brazil
Anavitória
Cartola

Bulgaria

The Bisserov Sisters
Bistritsa Babi
Bulgarka Junior Quartet
Pirin Folk Ensemble
Svetoglas
Trio Bulgarka

Canada

A–M

Susan Aglukark
The Band
Del Barber
Kim Barlow
Be Good Tanyas
Heather Bishop
La Bolduc
La Bottine Souriante
Oscar Brand
Tim Chaisson
Bruce Cockburn
Leonard Cohen
The Cottars
Crash Vegas
Bonnie Dobson
Luke Doucet
Wilf Doyle
The Duhks
Fred Eaglesmith
Kathleen Edwards
Stephen Fearing
Ferron
Serge Fiori
Jeremy Fisher
Flying Bulgar Klezmer Band
David Francey
Ginalina
Great Big Sea
Great Lake Swimmers
Norm Hacking
Sarah Harmer
Harmonium
Hart-Rouge
Wade Hemsworth
The Hidden Cameras
Veda Hille
Ian & Sylvia
Reid Jamieson
James Keelaghan
Mary Jane Lamond
Abigail Lapell
Leah
Gordon Lightfoot
Old Man Luedecke
Ashley MacIsaac
Buddy MacMaster
Natalie MacMaster
Rita MacNeil
Kate & Anna McGarrigle
Loreena McKennitt
Murray McLauchlan
Lynn Miles
Alan Mills
Joni Mitchell

N–Z

Jory Nash
Faith Nolan
The Paperboys
Evalyn Parry
Passenger
Po' Girl
Le Rêve du Diable
Garnet Rogers
Nathan Rogers
Stan Rogers
Buffy Sainte-Marie
Jonathan Seet
Ron Sexsmith
Rae Spoon
The Travellers
Lucie Blue Tremblay
Valdy
Le Vent du Nord
The Wailin' Jennys
Loudon Wainwright III
Dawud Wharnsby
Jesse Winchester
Ken Yates
Neil Young

Chile

Víctor Jara
Violeta Parra

Czech Republic

Moravia

Karel Kryl
Jaromír Nohavica

Denmark

Helene Blum
Jullie Hjetland
Rune T. Kidde
Nina & Frederik

Finland

Timo Alakotila
Angelit
Frigg
Gjallarhorn
Islaja
Arto Järvelä
Mauno Järvelä
JPP
Konsta Jylhä
Sari Kaasinen
Maria Kalaniemi
Sanna Kurki-Suonio
Loituma
Värttinä
Jenny Wilhelms
Wimme

France

Sacha Distel
Maxime Le Forestier
Malicorne
Gus Viseur

Brittany

Dan Ar Braz
Jean Chocun
Jean-Paul Corbineau
Jean-Louis Jossic
Kej
Kornog
Alan Stivell
Tri Yann
Nolwenn Leroy

Greece

Byzantine psalmody

Nektaria Karantzi

Paleá dhimotiká

Aristidis Moschos
Chronis Aidonidis
Haris Alexiou
Rosa Eskenazi
Marika Papagika
Giorgos Papasideris
Vassilis Tsitsanis
Markos Vamvakaris

Nisiótika
Greek Islands' songs (Νησιώτικα):

Mariza Koch
Domna Samiou

Hungary

Ági Szalóki
Márta Sebestyén
Muzsikás
The Moon and the Nightspirit

India

Indian female folk singers

A–G

Ila Arun
Malini Awasthi
Allah Jilai Bai
Gulab Bai
Teejan Bai
Dipali Barthakur
Parvathy Baul
Chinnaponnu
Anima Choudhury
Anupama Deshpande
Bindhyabasini Devi
Gambhari Devi
Vinjamuri Seetha Devi
Shreya Ghoshal
Dolly Guleria

H–S

Vishaka Hari
Abhaya Hiranmayi
Jagmohan Kaur
Kollangudi Karuppayee
Jagjit Kaur
Parkash Kaur
Ranjit Kaur
Surinder Kaur
Anitha Kuppusamy
Belli Lalitha
Swaran Lata (singer)
Hildamit Lepcha
Kumari Kanchan Dinkerao Mail
Manpreet Akhtar
Lopamudra Mitra
Paravai Muniyamma
Rockstar Ramani Ammal
Vithabai Bhau Mang Narayangaonkar
Vijayalakshmi Navaneethakrishnan
Nooran Sisters
Pratima Barua Pandey
Kalpana Patowary
Malika Pukhraj
Rajnigandha Shekhawat
Meena Rana
Sheetal Sathe
Thanjai Selvi
Sharda Sinha
Sithara (singer)

T–Z

Vangapandu Usha
Vimalakka
Hira Devi Waiba
Navneet Aditya Waiba

Indian male folk singers

A–G

 A.R. Akela
 Abdul Alim (folk singer)
 Guda Anjaiah
 Sukhraj Aujla
 Pammi Bai
 Rasamayi Balakishan
 Patthe Bapurao
 Paban Das Baul
 Bhopa
 S. D. Burman
 Hemant Chauhan
 Anthony Daasan
 Jhusia Damai
 Bipul Chettri
 Gaddar
 Bhikhudan Gadhvi
 Karnail Gill
 Habib Painter

H–S

 Hans Raj Hans
 Balappa Hukkeri
 Lal Chand Yamla Jatt
 Kalekuri Prasad
 Avtar Singh Kang
 H. R. Keshava Murthy
 Ateeq Hussain Khan
 Kachra Khan
 Sabar Koti
 Khagen Mahanta
 Asa Singh Mastana
 Morup Namgyal
 Naranappa Uppoor
 Shishir Parkhie
 Rameshwar Pathak
 Karnail Rana
 Adarsh Rathore
 Wilfy Rebimbus
 Devdatta Sable
 Shahir Krishnarao Sable
 Master Saleem
 Purna Das Baul
 Satinder Sartaaj
 Madan Gopal Singh
 Ghulam Hassan Sofi
 Deshapati Srinivas

T–Z

 Prahlad Tipanya
 Vitthal Umap
 Wadali Brothers
 Warsi Brothers

Ireland

ALT
Altan
Mary Black
Luka Bloom
The Bothy Band
Paul Brady
Kevin Burke
Karan Casey
The Chieftains
The Clancy Brothers
Liam Clancy
Willie Clancy
Clannad
Michael Coleman
The Corrs
De Danann
Dervish
Cara Dillon
Johnny Doran
The Dubliners
Séamus Egan
Energy Orchard
Seamus Ennis
Brian Finnegan
Orla Gartland
Frankie Gavin
Goats Don't Shave
Len Graham
Lisa Hannigan
Frank Harte
Martin Hayes
Andy Irvine
The Johnstons
Dolores Keane
Frankie Kennedy
Sinéad Lohan
Lúnasa
Dónal Lunny
Tommy Makem
Michael McGoldrick
Matt Molloy
Christy Moore
James Morrison
Van Morrison
Johnny Moynihan
Máire Ní Chathasaigh
Muireann Nic Amhlaoibh
Maura O'Connell
Sinéad O'Connor
Liam O'Flynn
Sally Oldfield
Patrick Street
Planxty
The Pogues
Fionn Regan
Damien Rice
Micho Russell
Sharon Shannon
Davy Spillane
Paddy Tunney
The Waterboys
Andy White
The Wolfe Tones

Israel

Chava Alberstein
David Broza
Bradley Fish
Mark Eliyahu

Italy

Adamo
Carlo Buti
Francesco Guccini
 Fabrizio De André

Japan

Rinken Band

Mexico

Joan Sebastian

Netherlands

Omnia

New Zealand

Martin Curtis
Flight of the Conchords
Luke Hurley
Bic Runga
Mahinarangi Tocker
Topp Twins
Marcus Turner

Norway

Frigg
Myllarguten
Annbjørg Lien
Chateau Neuf Spelemannslag

Peru

Wayno

Philippines

Freddie Aguilar

Romania
Veta Biriș

Russian Federation

Jeanne Bichevskaya
Sasha Lazard
Ivan Rebroff
Terem Quartet

Slovenia

Slavko Avsenik
Atomik Harmonik

South Africa

Ladysmith Black Mambazo
Mahotella Queens
Miriam Makeba
David Kramer

Spain

La Musgaña
Llan de Cubel
Hevia
Luar Na Lubre
Jorge Pardo
Carlos Núñez
Radio Tarifa
Narciso Yepes

Sweden

First aid kit
Francis
Frifot
Garmarna
Per Gudmundson
Emma Härdelin
Hedningarna
Pehr Hörberg
Åsa Jinder
Sofia Karlsson
Hållbus Totte Mattson
Ale Möller
Anders Norudde
Swåp
The Tallest Man On Earth
Roger Tallroth
Triakel
Väsen
Lena Willemark

Tibet

Yungchen Lhamo

Turkey

Altın Gün
Aşık Veysel
Muhlis Akarsu
Belkis Akkale
Selda Bağcan
Ali Ekber Cicek
Nesimi Çimen
Lalezar Ensemble
Musa Eroğlu
Neşet Ertaş
Hasret Gültekin
Udi Hrant
Ahmet Kaya
Erkan Oğur
Arif Sağ
Baba Zula

Tuva

Huun-Huur-Tu
Kongar-ol Ondar

United Kingdom

England

A–M

Mike Absalom
Harvey Andrews
Joan Armatrading
Frankie Armstrong
Badly Drawn Boy
Roy Bailey
Peter Bellamy
Birdy
Blowzabella
Jon Boden
Bombay Bicycle Club
Billy Bragg
Anne Briggs
Jake Bugg
Vashti Bunyan
Eliza Carthy
Martin Carthy
Jim Causley
Dolly Collins
Shirley Collins
Coope Boyes and Simpson
Pete Cooper
Copper family
Harry Cox
Andy Cutting
Sandy Denny
Lonnie Donegan
Nick Drake
Barry Dransfield
Nigel Eaton
Edward II
Emmy the Great
George Ezra
Fairport Convention
Flook
Jo Freya
Vin Garbutt
Davey Graham
David Gray
Clive Gregson
John Wesley Harding
Bella Hardy
Roy Harper
Boo Hewerdine
Robyn Hitchcock
Ben Howard
Ashley Hutchings
Bert Jansch
Nic Jones
Wizz Jones
Fred Jordan
Sandra Kerr
William Kimber
John Kirkpatrick
Chris Leslie
Bert Lloyd
Jez Lowe
Kirsty MacColl
Laura Marling
John Martyn
Iain Matthews
Kirsty McGee
Ralph McTell
Pete Morton
Mumford and Sons

N–Z

Simon Nicol
Old Swan Band
Beth Orton
Oysterband
Roo Panes
Passenger
Brian Peters
Maddy Prior
John Renbourn
Saul Rose
Kate Rusby
Martin Simpson
Slow Club
John Spiers
Steeleye Span
Cat Stevens
Stornoway
The Story
Joe Summers
Dave Swarbrick
Sam Sweeney
June Tabor
John Tams
Jeremy Taylor
TESS
Scan Tester
Jake Thackray
Richard Thompson
Teddy Thompson
Karen Tweed
Uiscedwr
Lal Waterson
Norma Waterson
The Watersons
Lewis Watson
Whippersnapper
Roger Wilson
Chris Wood
The Young Tradition

Cornwall

Dalla
Fisherman's Friends
Brenda Wootton

Northumberland

Jack Armstrong
John Armstrong (of Carrick)
Tommy Armstrong
Will Atkinson
Tom Clough
Johnny Handle
George Hepple
Joe Hutton
Jack the Lad
James Hill
Nancy Kerr
Billy Pigg
Jock Purdon
Colin Ross
Kathryn Tickell
Robert Whinham
The Witches of Elswick

Isle of Man

Christine Collister

Northern Ireland

Scotland

Aidan O'Rourke
Alistair Hulett
Alasdair Roberts
Aly Bain
Amy MacDonald
Archie Fisher
Battlefield Band
Bert Jansch
Billy Connolly
Capercaillie
Catriona MacDonald
Dick Gaughan
Duncan Chisholm
Donovan
Eric Bogle
Ewan MacColl
Gordon Duncan
Ian Campbell Folk Group
Ivan Drever
James Mackintosh
John McCusker
Johnny Cunningham
Julie Fowlis
Karine Polwart
Kris Drever
Lau
Linda Thompson
Martyn Bennett
Matt McGinn
Phil Cunningham
Rachel Hair
Shooglenifty
Sileas
Silly Wizard
Simon Thoumire
The Corries
The House Band
The Incredible String Band
The McCalmans
The Tannahill Weavers
Tom Anderson
Wolfstone

Wales

Fernhill
Jack Harris
Mary Hopkin
Sian James
Ceri Rhys Matthews
Julie Murphy
Siobhan Owen
Siân Phillips
Phil Tanner

United States

Appalachian

Clarence Ashley
Joe Bethancourt
Dock Boggs
Fleming Brown
Dick Burnett
Guy Carawan
Sara Carter
Stoney Cooper
Hazel Dickens
Roscoe Holcomb
Tommy Jarrell
Kossoy Sisters
Wilma Lee
Bascom Lamar Lunsford
New Lost City Ramblers
Uncle Charlie Osborne
Jean Ritchie
Sam Rizzetta
Loraine Wyman
Doc Watson
Uncle Dave Macon
Charlie Poole
Possessed by Paul James
Rising Appalachia

Cajun and zydeco

Fernest Arceneaux
Amédé Ardoin
Chris Ardoin
Dewey Balfa
BeauSoleil
Bobby Charles
Boozoo Chavis
C. J. Chenier
Clifton Chenier
Geno Delafose
John Delafose
Keith Frank
Queen Ida
Beau Jocque
Rosie Ledet
D. L. Menard
Jimmy C. Newman
Steve Riley and the Mamou Playboys
Rockin' Dopsie
Rockin' Sidney
Amanda Shaw
Terrance Simien
Jo-El Sonnier
Nathan Williams
Buckwheat Zydeco
Zydeco Force

General

A–C

The Accidentals
Kasey Chambers
Derroll Adams
A Fragile Tomorrow
The Almanac Singers
Eric Andersen
Jamie Anderson
Joan Baez
Devendra Banhart
Robin Batteau
Dan Bern
Leon Bibb
Theodore Bikel
Billy Pilgrim
David Blue
Hugh Blumenfeld
Dock Boggs
Gordon Bok
Ralston Bowles
Bryan Bowers
Oscar Brand
Brewer & Shipley
Chuck Brodsky
The Broken String Band
David Bromberg
Jonatha Brooke
The Brothers Four
Greg Brown
Tim Buckley
David Buskin
Rolf Cahn
Andrew Calhoun
Hamilton Camp
Guy Carawan
Mary Chapin Carpenter
Liz Carroll
Dave Carter
Chad Mitchell Trio
Len Chandler
Harry Chapin
Tracy Chapman
The Chenille Sisters
Cherish the Ladies
Vic Chesnutt
Frank Christian
Meg Christian
The Civil Wars
Paul Clayton
Slaid Cleaves
Shana Cleveland
Judy Collins
Lui Collins
Shawn Colvin
Annette Conlon
Matt Costa
Elizabeth Cotten
Jim Croce
Mike Cross
Sis Cunningham
Catie Curtis

D–F

Barbara Dane
Erik Darling
Grey DeLisle
Kris Delmhorst
Iris DeMent
John Denver
Ani DiFranco
Alice Di Micele
disappear fear
Alix Dobkin
DW (Dave) Drouillard
Antje Duvekot
Richard Dyer-Bennet
Bob Dylan
Eddie from Ohio
Seamus Egan
Cass Elliot
Ramblin' Jack Elliott
Mark Erelli
John Fahey
Mimi Fariña
Richard Fariña
Anne Feeney
Melissa Ferrick
Cathy Fink
Steve Forbert
Mark Fosson
Jeffrey Foucault
Four Bitchin' Babes
Bob Franke
Donavon Frankenreiter
Debbie Friedman

G–J

Gaia Consort
Garfunkel and Oates
Mary Gauthier
Bob Gibson
Ronnie Gilbert
Vance Gilbert
Eliza Gilkyson
Terry Gilkyson
Steve Gillette
Tif Ginn
Girlyman
Joe Glazer
Steve Goodman
John Gorka
Tracy Grammer
Greenbriar Boys
Patty Griffin
Nanci Griffith
Arlo Guthrie
Sarah Lee Guthrie
Woody Guthrie
Kristen Hall
Frank Hamilton
Kristy Hanson
Jack Hardy
Kelly Harrell
Jesse Harris
Richie Havens
Bess Lomax Hawes
Lee Hays
John Herald
Priscilla Herdman
Carolyn Hester
Sara Hickman
The Highwaymen
Anne Hills
David Holt
Holy Modal Rounders
Rita Hosking
Cisco Houston
Michael Hurley
Janis Ian
Indigo Girls
Iron & Wine
Bon Iver
Eileen Ivers
Burl Ives
Ella Jenkins
Jim and Jean
Jewel Kilcher
Orville Johnson
Freedy Johnston
Billy Jonas
Diana Jones
Dick Justice

K–M

Si Kahn
Shira Kammen
Christine Kane
Lucy Kaplansky
Buell Kazee
The Kennedys
Barbara Kessler
Jennifer Kimball
Charlie King
The Kingston Trio
The Klezmatics
Bonnie Koloc
Leo Kottke
Peter La Farge
Jimmy LaFave
Bruce Langhorne
Patty Larkin
Lavender Diamond
Christine Lavin
Lead Belly
Katie Lee
Julius Lester
Jeffrey Lewis
Lily and Maria
The Limeliters
Alan Lomax
Laura Love
Lullaby for the Working Class
The Mammals
Cindy Mangsen
Woody Mann
Roger Manning
Marcy Marxer
Molly Mason
Willy Mason
David Massengill
Ed McCurdy
John McCutcheon
Country Joe McDonald
Brownie McGhee
Lori McKenna
Will McLean
Melanie
Ingrid Michaelson
Bill Miller
Roger Miller
Anaïs Mitchell
Modern Folk Quartet
Alastair Moock
Bill Morrissey
Moxy Früvous
Geoff Muldaur
Maria Muldaur
Peter Mulvey

N–R

Holly Near
Fred Neil
Ayla Nereo
The New Christy Minstrels
Carrie Newcomer
Joanna Newsom
Nickel Creek
The Nields
Willie Nile
John Jacob Niles
Conor Oberst
Phil Ochs
Mark O'Connor
Odetta
Jerry O'Sullivan
Jim Page
Patrick Park
Tom Paxton
Ellis Paul
Alice Peacock
Elvis Perkins
Peter, Paul & Mary
Gretchen Peters
Utah Phillips
Phranc
Wally Pleasant
Rose Polenzani
John Prine
Chris Pureka
Ratsy
Toshi Reagon
Rebecca Riots
Red Molly
Del Rey
Malvina Reynolds
Jean Ritchie
Josh Ritter
Earl Robinson
The Roches
Libby Roderick
The Rooftop Singers
Jack Rose
Josh Rouse
Tom Rush

S–T

The Sandpipers
Claudia Schmidt
Eric Schwartz
Mike Seeger
Peggy Seeger
Pete Seeger
The Serendipity Singers
Martin Sexton
Linda Shear
The Shells
Richard Shindell
Michelle Shocked
Paul Siebel
Judee Sill
Simon & Garfunkel
Patrick Sky
Langhorne Slim
Fred Small
Chloe Smith
Elliott Smith
Michael Peter Smith
Mindy Smith
Stephan Smith
Chris Smither
Solas
Faith Soloway
Leah Song
Rosalie Sorrels
Mark Spoelstra
Bill Staines
James Lee Stanley
Starling Arrow
Jody Stecher
Sufjan Stevens
The Story
Sweet Honey in the Rock
Taylor Swift
The Tarriers
James Taylor
Livingston Taylor
Luke Temple
Rosie Thomas
Trapezoid
Artie Traum
Happy Traum
Two Nice Girls

U–Z

Uncle Bonsai
Jay Ungar
Dave Van Ronk
Townes Van Zandt
Suzanne Vega
Voices on the Verge
Eric Von Schmidt
Loudon Wainwright III
Tom Waits
M. Ward
Washington Squares
Linda Waterfall
Doc Watson
Willie Watson
The Weavers
The Weepies
Gillian Welch
Susan Werner
Hedy West
Floyd Red Crow Westerman
Cheryl Wheeler
Erica Wheeler
Whiskeytown
Josh White
William Elliott Whitmore
David Wilcox
Dar Williams
Lucinda Williams
Victoria Williams
Cris Williamson
Wishing Chair
Denison Witmer
Kate Wolf
Hally Wood
Martin Zellar

Uzbekistan

Turgun Alimatov

See also

 Traditional singer
Lists of musicians

Lists of musicians by genre